K. V. Surendranath (died 9 September 2005) was a former MP of India Thiruvananthapuram. He was a leader of Communist Party of India.

References

India MPs 1996–1997
2005 deaths
Communist Party of India politicians from Kerala
Lok Sabha members from Kerala
Members of the Kerala Legislative Assembly
Year of birth missing
Politicians from Thiruvananthapuram